The Aley is a river in Altai Krai, Russia. It is a left tributary of the Ob. Bigger towns along the river are Rubtsovsk and Aleysk.

Course
The river flows along the Ob Plateau in its middle and lower course.

See also
Inland port
List of rivers of Russia

References

Rivers of Altai Krai